Bartłomiej Grzechnik  (born 8 February 1993) is a Polish volleyball player, a member of the Polish club Czarni Radom.

Career

National team
On April 2, 2015 was appointed to the Polish national team by head coach Stephane Antiga. After the training camp in Spała he went to team B of Polish national team led by Andrzej Kowal. He took part in 1st edition of 2015 European Games. On August 14, 2015 he achieved first medal as national team player – bronze of European League. His national team won 3rd place match with Estonia (3–0).

External links
 Player profile at CEV.eu
 Player profile at PlusLiga.pl
 Player profile at Volleybox.net

References

1993 births
Living people
People from Radom
Sportspeople from Masovian Voivodeship
Polish men's volleyball players
European Games competitors for Poland
Volleyball players at the 2015 European Games
Czarni Radom players
BBTS Bielsko-Biała players
MKS Będzin players